Narayanan Kutty or Kalabhavan Narayanankutty is a Malayalam film actor. He has acted in more than 300 films. He handles mainly comedy roles.

Background
Narayanan Kutty was born Ernakulam. He started his career as a mimicry artist in Kalabhavan, Kochi. His debut movie is Onnu Muthal Poojyam Vare in 1986. He was an active participant of Malayalee House season 1 and evicted in 5th week. He is married and has a daughter.

Partial filmography

Sudokku'N (2022)
Who Is Right (2021) (short film)
Pappantem Simontem Piller (2021)
Kaalchilambu (2021)
Oru Pazhaya Bomb Kadha (2018)
Kalyanam (2018)
Oru Murai Vanthu Parthaya (2016)
Ring Master (2014) as Doctor
Salala Mobiles (2014) as Constable Ramachandran
Nadodimannan (2013)
 Hotel California(2013)
 For Sale (2013) as Shaji
 Mr.Bean (2013)
 Kadal Kadannu Oru Maathukutty (2013)
 Vallatha Pahayan (2013)
 Rebecca Uthup Kizhakkemala (2013)
 3 Dots (2013)
 Police Maman (2013) as Police Inspector
 Tourist Home (2013) as Shivankutty 
 Radio (2013)
 Chettayees (2012)
 Kaashh (2012)
 Kunjaliyan (2012) as Shashankan 
 Doctor Innocent aanu (2012)
 Yaadhaarthyam (2012)
 Cinema Company (2012)
 Friday 11.11.11 (2012)
 Ordinary (2012)
 Ulakam Chuttum Valiban (2011) as Vinayaka Panicker 
 The Filmstaar(2011)
 Pachuvum Kovalanum (2011) as Boniface 
 Snehaadaram (2011)
 Kudumbasree Travels (2011)
 Maharaja Talkies (2011)
 Seniors (2011)
 Uppukandam Brothers Back in Action (2011) as Soman 
 Manikiakkallu (2011)
 Doubles (2011) as Mukuntan
 Sarkar Colony (2011)
 Thaskara Lahala (2010)
 Karayilekku Oru Kadal Dooram (2010)
 Raama Raavanan (2010)
 Advocate Lakshmanan – Ladies Only (2010)
 Valiyangadi (2010)
 Paappi Appacha (2010)
 Koottukar (2010)
 Again Kasargod Khader Bhai (2010)
 Kadaksham (2010) as Drama Artist 
 Oridathoru Postman (2010)
 Thathwamasi (2009)
 Utharaswayamvaram (2009)
 Paribhavam (2009)
 2 Harihar Nagar (2009)
 Kappal Muthalaali (2009)
 Oru Black and White Kudumbam (2009)
 My Big Father (2009) as Marriage Broker 
 Colours (2009) as Police Officer 
 Pramukhan (2009) as Sethumadhavan Pillai 
 Meghatheertham (2009)
 Love In Singapore (2009)
 Crazy Gopalan (2008)
 LollyPop (2008) as Ambrose 
 Hareendran Oru Nishkalankan (2007) as Hareendran's servant 
 Abraham & Lincoln (2007)
 Nagaram (2007) as Monayi
 Mayavi (2007)
 Avan Chandiyude Makan (2007) as Prahaladan
 Athisayan (2007)
 Baba Kalyani (2006) as Police Constable 
 Bada Dosth (2006)
 Pothan Vava (2006)
 Karutha Pakshikal (2006) as Schoolmaster 
 Highway Police (2006) as Kochuvanam Velu
 Chacko Randaaman (2006)
 Finger Print (2005)
 Nerariyan CBI (2005)
 Nottam (2006)
OK Chacko Cochin Mumbai (2005)
 Junior Senior (2005)
 Chirattakkalippaattangal (2005)
 Rasikan (2004) as Annachi
 Vellinakshatram (2004)
 CID Moosa (2003) as Police Constable 
 Chithrakoodam (2003)
 Kerala House Udan Vilpanakku (2004)
 Ee Bhaargaveenilayam (2002)
 Aala (2002)
 Kaiyethum Doorath (2002)
 Kalyanaraman (2002)
 Mazhathullikkilukkam (2002)
 Korappan The Great (2001)
 Ee Parakkum Thalika (2001) as Police Inspector
 Dupe Dupe Dupe (2001)
 Thenkasipattanam (2000)
 Vaazhunnor (1999)
 Sooryavanam (1998)
 Kudamaattam (1997)
Ranger (film) (1997)
 Lelam (1997) as Sadasivan 
 Mookkilla Raajyathu Murimookkan Raajaavu (1996)
 Mimics Super 1000 (1996)
 Kireedamillaatha Raajakkanmaar(1996) as Thekkan Pathrose
 Kavaadam (1996)
 Sulthan Hyderali (1996) as Paramu
 Vaanarasena (1996) as Romeo Bhaskaran
 Kakkakum Poochakkum Kalyanam (1995) as Beggar 
 Mimics Action 500 (1995)
 Manathe Kottaram (1994) as map seller
 Chukkan(1994) as Tailor
 Moonnaam Loka Pattaalam (1994) as Kochappi
 Kizhakkan Pathrose (1992)
 Ulladakkam (1991)
 Nanma Niranjavan Sreenivasan (1990)
 Onnu Muthal Poojyam Vare (1986)

References

External links

Narayanan Kutty at MSI
 http://www.malayalachalachithram.com/movieslist.php?tot=66&a=5529&p=7
 http://www.metromatinee.com/artist/Narayanankutty-688

Indian male film actors
Male actors from Thiruvananthapuram
Male actors in Malayalam cinema
Living people
Year of birth missing (living people)
20th-century Indian male actors
21st-century Indian male actors